In mathematics, the Krull–Schmidt theorem states that a group subjected to certain finiteness conditions on chains of subgroups, can be uniquely written as a finite direct product of indecomposable subgroups.

Definitions
We say that a group G satisfies the ascending chain condition (ACC) on subgroups if every sequence of subgroups of G:

is eventually constant, i.e., there exists N such that GN = GN+1 = GN+2 = ... . We say that G satisfies the ACC on normal subgroups if every such sequence of normal subgroups of G eventually becomes constant.

Likewise, one can define the descending chain condition on (normal) subgroups, by looking at all decreasing sequences of (normal) subgroups:

Clearly, all finite groups satisfy both ACC and DCC on subgroups. The infinite cyclic group  satisfies ACC but not DCC, since (2) > (2)2 > (2)3 > ... is an infinite decreasing sequence of subgroups.

We say a group G is indecomposable if it cannot be written as a direct product of non-trivial subgroups G = H × K.

Statement

Here, uniqueness means direct decompositions into indecomposable subgroups have the exchange property. Then  and there is a reindexing of the 's satisfying

  for each .

Proof
Proving existence is relatively straightforward: let  be the set of all normal subgroups that can not be written as a product of indecomposable subgroups.  Moreover, any indecomposable subgroup is (trivially) the one-term direct product of itself, hence decomposable.  If Krull-Schmidt fails, then  contains ; so we may iteratively construct a descending series of direct factors; this contradicts the DCC.  One can then invert the construction to show that all direct factors of  appear in this way.  

The proof of uniqueness, on the other hand, is quite long and requires a sequence of technical lemmas.  For a complete exposition, see.

Remark

The theorem does not assert the existence of a non-trivial decomposition, but merely that any such two decompositions (if they exist) are the same.

Remak decomposition
A Remak decomposition, introduced by Robert Remak, is a decomposition of an abelian group or similar object into a finite direct sum of indecomposable objects. The Krull–Schmidt theorem gives conditions for a Remak decomposition to exist and for its factors to be unique.

Krull–Schmidt theorem for modules
If  is a module that satisfies the ACC and DCC on submodules (that is, it is both Noetherian and Artinian or – equivalently – of finite length), then  is a direct sum of indecomposable modules. Up to a permutation, the indecomposable components in such a direct sum are uniquely determined up to isomorphism.

In general, the theorem fails if one only assumes that the module is Noetherian or Artinian.

History

The present-day Krull–Schmidt theorem was first proved by Joseph Wedderburn (Ann. of Math (1909)), for finite groups, though he mentions some credit is due to an earlier study of G.A. Miller where direct products of abelian groups were considered.  Wedderburn's theorem is stated as an exchange property between direct decompositions of maximum length.  However, Wedderburn's proof makes no use of automorphisms.

The thesis of Robert Remak (1911) derived the same uniqueness result as Wedderburn but also proved (in modern terminology) that the group of central automorphisms acts transitively on the set of direct decompositions of maximum length of a finite group.   From that stronger theorem Remak also proved various corollaries including that groups with a trivial center and perfect groups have a unique Remak decomposition.

Otto Schmidt (Sur les produits directs, S. M. F. Bull. 41 (1913), 161–164), simplified the main theorems of Remak to the 3 page predecessor to today's textbook proofs.  His method improves Remak's use of idempotents to create the appropriate central automorphisms.  Both Remak and Schmidt published subsequent proofs and corollaries to their theorems.

Wolfgang Krull (Über verallgemeinerte endliche Abelsche Gruppen, M. Z. 23 (1925) 161–196), returned to G.A. Miller's original problem of direct products of abelian groups by extending to abelian operator groups with ascending and descending chain conditions.  This is most often stated in the language of modules.  His proof observes that the idempotents used in the proofs of Remak and Schmidt can be restricted to module homomorphisms; the remaining details of the proof are largely unchanged.

O. Ore unified the proofs from various categories include finite groups, abelian operator groups, rings and algebras by proving the exchange theorem of Wedderburn holds for modular lattices with descending and ascending chain conditions.  This proof makes no use of idempotents and does not reprove the transitivity of Remak's theorems.

Kurosh's The Theory of Groups and Zassenhaus' The Theory of Groups include the proofs of Schmidt and Ore under the name of Remak–Schmidt but acknowledge Wedderburn and Ore.  Later texts use the title Krull–Schmidt (Hungerford's Algebra) and Krull–Schmidt–Azumaya (Curtis–Reiner).  The name Krull–Schmidt is now popularly substituted for any theorem concerning uniqueness of direct products of maximum size.  Some authors choose to call direct decompositions of maximum-size Remak decompositions to honor his contributions.

See also
 Krull–Schmidt category

References

Further reading
 A. Facchini: Module theory. Endomorphism rings and direct sum decompositions in some classes of modules. Progress in Mathematics, 167. Birkhäuser Verlag, Basel, 1998. 
 C.M. Ringel: Krull–Remak–Schmidt fails for Artinian modules over local rings. Algebr. Represent. Theory 4 (2001), no. 1, 77–86.

External links
 Page at PlanetMath

Module theory
Theorems in group theory